The Gateway newspaper''' was a business and careers online newspaper, formerly print and digital and then exclusively digital, read by students and graduates. It was popular with students at a range of UK universities and had readers around the world. The Gateway produced analysis, career advice and employer insights, as well as profiling paid internship opportunities and graduate jobs.

First published at Oxford University in October 2007, The Gateway was often dubbed "the student FT" due to being printed on the same light salmon paper as the Financial Times. Published by Career Gateways Limited, The Gateway specialised in making the world of business and finance accessible to students pursuing a career in the city.

HistoryThe Gateway was conceived by three Oxford University students, Mawuli Ladzekpo (Exeter College), Max Lewis (Pembroke College) and Chris Wilkinson (Lincoln College) in the summer of 2007.  The trio aimed to fill the apparent niche for a publication that combined business and financial news with independent careers advice, and sought to take advantage of the growing graduate recruitment marketing industry that centered around Oxbridge.  The first issue of The Gateway was released on 8 October 2007 with a circulation of 6,000 at Oxford University.

In November 2007, The Gateway received commercial backing when the London based boutique recruitment consultancy, OxbridgeGroup, bought a stake in Career Gateways Limited.  This injection of capital allowed for an increased distribution of The Gateway to include an additional fourteen universities in the United Kingdom.  It also resulted in The Gateway shedding its student workforce recruited by its founders, to be replaced with a team of full-time staff based at The Gateways headquarters in the London Docklands.  The company remained managed, in part, by its student founders.

The Gateway Online newspaper and website were shut down in around 2018/19.

Past editors
October 2009: Tom Toulson
October 2008: Will Hodges
October 2007: Mawuli Ladzekpo
Thereafter: Hannah Langworth

Distribution universitiesThe Gateway worked closely in particular with the following fifteen top universities in the United Kingdom, based loosely on the Russell Group.

 Cambridge University
 Imperial College London
 King's College London
 London School of Economics (LSE)
 Oxford University
 University College London
 University of Bath
 University of Bristol
 University of Edinburgh
 University of Exeter
 University of Durham
 University of Manchester
 University of Nottingham
 University of St Andrews
 University of Warwick

References

External links
The Gateway, contains all content published in The Gateway''.

Publications established in 2007
Newspapers published in Oxford
Student newspapers published in the United Kingdom
Publications associated with the University of Oxford